Francisca Vaz Queiroz (born September 4, 1979) is a Brazilian television and film actress. She played the lead role, Catarina, in the television series A Lei e o Crime.

Biography
Born in Campinas, São Paulo state, her father is an entrepreneur, while her mother is a lawyer. Francisca Queiroz started working as an amateur theater actress, initiating a model career when she was 16 years old. As a model, she traveled to places such as Japan and South Korea, before leaving the career when she was 18 years old. Francisca Queiroz started to study performing arts when she was 14 years old, moving to São Paulo two years later to work in the city's theaters.

Career
After turning 19 years old, Francisca Queiroz graduated at Rede Globo's performing arts academy, named Oficina de Atores. She played her first role in 2001, as a character named Ana, in Globo's miniseries Os Maias. She played her first role as a villain in 2003, in Globo's telenovela Agora é Que São Elas. Francisca Queiroz played the role of paraplegic teacher Vitória in Malhação's 2006 season. Francisca Queiroz played in 2007 another role as a villain, in Rede Record's telenovela Amor e Intrigas. She played her first lead role in 2009, in Rede Record's television series A Lei e o Crime, in which she played Police Chief Catarina.

Filmography

Television

Cinema

References

External links
 

Living people
1979 births
People from Campinas
Brazilian film actresses
Brazilian telenovela actresses
Brazilian female models